Protonerius is a genus of flies in the family Neriidae.

Species
Protonerius opacus Sepúlveda & Marinoni, 2021
Protonerius guttipennis (Meijere, 1921)

References

Brachycera genera
Neriidae
Taxa named by Johannes C. H. de Meijere
Diptera of Asia